Julianus uruguayus (commonly known as Schmidt's Uruguay tree frog) is a species of frog in the family Hylidae.
It is found in Argentina, Brazil, and Uruguay.
Its natural habitats are moist savanna, subtropical or tropical seasonally wet or flooded lowland grassland, freshwater marshes, and intermittent freshwater marshes.
It is threatened by habitat loss.

References

Hylidae
Amphibians described in 1944
Taxonomy articles created by Polbot
Taxobox binomials not recognized by IUCN